Werauhia van-hyningii is a plant species in the genus Werauhia. This species is endemic to Mexico.

References

van-hyningii
Endemic flora of Mexico